GSAT-6A was a communication satellite launched by the Indian Space Research Organisation (ISRO) It featured a  unfurlable S-band antenna similar to the one used on GSAT-6. Around 17 minutes after lift-off, the three stage GSLV Mk.II rocket flying on GSLV F08 mission successfully injected the satellite into a geosynchronous transfer orbit. Due to power failure during its orbit raising burns the communication was lost with GSAT-6A before it could reach its final circular geostationary orbit (GSO).

History
GSAT-6A was launched to complement GSAT-6 satellite which was launched in August 2015 by ISRO. The cost of building GSAT-6A was around ₹270 crore. GSAT-6A was to provide mobile communication services to the Indian Armed Forces.

Launch 

GSLV-F08 carrying GSAT-6A spacecraft was launched from Second Launch Pad of Satish Dhawan Space Centre on 29 March 2018, 11:26 UTC and after flight of 17 minutes 45 seconds, placed GSAT-6A into its planned geostationary transfer orbit with  apogee,  perigee and orbital inclination of 20.64°. GSAT-6A spacecraft deployed its solar array after separation from CUS and established contact with ground station.

On GSLV-F08, a High Thrust Vikas engine (HTVE) was inducted on second stage (GS2) of GSLV with 6% higher thrust than before. The improved engine increased the payload capability of the vehicle. The electrohydraulic  actuation system on second stage was also replaced with simpler and robust electromechanical system. The Cryogenic Upper Stage of GSLV F08 performed a burn to depletion for the first time. Officials said any improvement done to the vehicle would be incorporated into GSLV's future missions.

Loss of communication

The first orbit raising maneuver for GSAT-6A was carried out as planned on 30 March 2018 by firing the Liquid Apogee Motor (LAM) for 2188 seconds from 09:22 AM IST. The second orbit raising maneuver was carried out at 10:00 AM on 31 March 2018. As the satellite was on-course for its third and final orbit raising maneuver on 1 April 2018, communication with it was lost and the spacecraft was temporarily untraceable. After regaining its track, efforts to re-establish communication with the satellite could not succeed. Power system malfunction was suspected to be the reason behind loss of contact.

Satellite replacement 
ISRO will launch GSAT-32 satellite as replacement for GSAT-6A.

See also
 Indian military satellites

References 

GSAT satellites
Spacecraft launched by India in 2018
Spacecraft launched by GSLV rockets